The tanagers (singular ) comprise the bird family Thraupidae, in the order Passeriformes. The family has a Neotropical distribution and is the second-largest family of birds. It represents about 4% of all avian species and 12% of the Neotropical birds.

Traditionally, the family contained around 240 species of mostly brightly colored fruit-eating birds. As more of these birds were studied using modern molecular techniques, it became apparent that the traditional families were not monophyletic. Euphonia and Chlorophonia, which were once considered part of the tanager family, are now treated as members of the Fringillidae, in their own subfamily (Euphoniinae). Likewise, the genera Piranga (which includes the scarlet tanager, summer tanager, and western tanager), Chlorothraupis, and Habia appear to be members of the cardinal family, and have been reassigned to that family by the American Ornithological Society.

Description
Tanagers are small to medium-sized birds. Both sexes are usually the same size and weight.

Tanagers are often brightly colored, but some species are black and white.  Males are typically more brightly colored than females and juveniles.   Most tanagers have short, rounded wings. The shape of the bill seems to be linked to the species' foraging habits.

Distribution
Tanagers are restricted to the Western Hemisphere and mainly to the tropics. About 60% of tanagers live in South America, and 30% of these species live in the Andes. Most species are endemic to a relatively small area.

Behavior
Most tanagers live in pairs or in small groups of three to five individuals. These groups may consist simply of parents and their offspring. These birds may also be seen in single-species or mixed flocks. Many tanagers are thought to have dull songs, though some are elaborate.

Diet
Tanagers are omnivorous, and their diets vary by genus. They have been seen eating fruits, seeds, nectar, flower parts, and insects. Many pick insects off branches or from holes in the wood. Other species look for insects on the undersides of leaves. Yet others wait on branches until they see a flying insect and catch it in the air. Many of these particular species inhabit the same areas, but these specializations alleviate competition.

Breeding
The breeding season is March through June in temperate areas and in September through October in South America. Some species are territorial, while others build their nests closer together. Little information is available on tanager breeding behavior. Males show off their brightest feathers to potential mates and rival males. Some species' courtship rituals involve bowing and tail lifting.

Most tanagers build cup nests on branches in trees. Some nests are almost globular. Entrances are usually built on the side of the nest. The nests can be shallow or deep. The species of the tree in which they choose to build their nests and the nests' positions vary among genera. Most species nest in an area hidden by very dense vegetation. No information is yet known regarding the nests of some species.

The clutch size is three to five eggs. The female incubates the eggs and builds the nest, but the male may feed the female while she incubates. Both sexes feed the young. Five species have helpers assist in feeding the young. These helpers are thought to be the previous year's nestlings.

Taxonomy
The family Thraupidae was introduced (as the subfamily Thraupinae) in 1847 by German ornithologist Jean Cabanis. The type genus is Thraupis.

The family Thraupidae is a member of an assemblage of over 800 birds known as the New World, nine-primaried oscines. The traditional pre-molecular classification was largely based on the different feeding specializations. Nectar-feeders were placed in Coerebidae (honeycreepers), large-billed seed-eaters in Cardinalidae (cardinals and grosbeaks), smaller-billed seed-eaters in Emberizidae (New World finches and
sparrows), ground-foraging insect-eaters in Icteridae (blackbirds) and fruit-eaters 
in Thraupidae. This classification was known to be problematic as analyses using other morphological characteristics often produced conflicting phylogenies. Beginning in the last decade of the 20th century, a series of molecular phylogenetic studies led to a complete reorganization of the tradition families. Thraupidae now includes large-billed seed eaters, thin-billed nectar feeders, foliage gleaners as well as fruit-eaters.

One consequence of redefining the family boundaries is that for many species their common names are no longer congruent with the families in which they are placed. As of July 2020 there are 39 species with "tanager" in the common name that are not placed in Thraupidae. These include the widely distributed scarlet tanager and western tanager which are both now placed in Cardinalidae. There are also 106 species within Thraupidae that have "finch" in their common name.

A molecular phylogenetic study published in 2014 revealed that many of the traditional genera were not monophyletic. In the resulting reorganization six new genera were introduced, eleven genera were resurrected and seven genera were abandoned.

As of July 2021 the family contains 386 species which are divided into 15 subfamilies and 106 genera. For a complete list, see the article List of tanager species.

List of genera

Catamblyrhynchinae
The plushcap has no close relatives and is now placed in its own subfamily. It was previously placed either in the subfamily Catamblyrhynchinae within the Emberizidae or in its own family Catamblyrhynchidae.

Charitospizinae
The coal-crested finch is endemic to the grasslands of Brazil and has no close relatives. It is unusual in that both sexes have a crest. It was formerly placed in Emberizidae.

Orchesticinae
Two species with large thick bills. Parkerthraustes was formerly placed in Cardinalidae.

Nemosiinae
Brightly colored sexually dichromatic birds, most form single-species flocks

Emberizoidinae
Grassland dwelling birds that were formerly placed in Emberizidae.

Porphyrospizinae
Yellow billed birds: The blue finch (Porphyrospiza caerulescens) was formerly placed in the Cardinalidae; the other species were formerly placed in Emberizidae.

Hemithraupinae
These species are sexually dichromatic and many have yellow and black plumage. Except for Heterospingus they have slender bills.

Dacninae
Sexually dichromatic species—males have blue plumage and females are green.

Saltatorinae
Mainly arboreal with long tails and thick bills. Formerly placed in Cardinalidae.

Coerebinae

This subfamily includes Darwin's finches that are endemic to the Galápagos Islands and Cocos Island. Most of these species were formerly placed in the Emberizidae; the exceptions are the bananaquit that was placed in the Parulidae and the orangequit that was placed in the Thraupidae. These species build domed or covered nests with side entrances. They have evolved a variety of foraging techniques, including nectar-feeding (Coereba, Euneornis), seed-eating (Geospiza, Loxigilla, Tiaris), and insect gleaning (Certhidea).

Darwin's finches:

Tachyphoninae
Most of these are lowland species. Many have ornamental features such as crests, and many have sexually dichromatic plumage.

Sporophilinae
These species were formerly placed in Emberizidae.

Poospizinae
Some of these species were formerly placed in Emberizidae.

Diglossinae
This is a morphologically diverse group that includes seed-eaters (Nesospiza, Sicalis, Catamenia, Haplospiza), arthropod feeders (Conirostrum), a bamboo specialist (Acanthidops), an aphid feeder (Xenodacnis), and boulder field specialists (Idiopsar). Many species live at high altitudes. Conirostrum was previously placed in Parulidae, Diglossa was placed in Thraupidae and the remaining genera were placed in Emberizidae.

Thraupinae
Typical tanagers

Genera formerly placed in Thraupidae
Passerellidae – New World sparrows
Chlorospingus – eight species - bush-tanagers
Oreothraupis – tanager finch

Cardinalidae – cardinals
 Piranga – 9 species - northern tanagers
 Habia – five species - ant-tanagers or habias
 Chlorothraupis – three species
 Amaurospiza – four species

Fringillidae – subfamily Euphoniinae
 Euphonia – 27 species
 Chlorophonia – five species

Phaenicophilidae – Hispaniolan tanagers
 Microligea – green-tailed warbler
 Xenoligea – white-winged warbler
 Phaenicophilus – two species

Mitrospingidae – Mitrospingid tanagers
 Mitrospingus – two species
 Orthogonys – olive-green tanager
 Lamprospiza – red-billed pied tanager

Nesospingidae
 Nesospingus – Puerto Rican tanager

Spindalidae
 Spindalis – four species - spindalises

Calyptophilidae
 Calyptophilus – two species - chat-tanagers

Rhodinocichlidae
 Rhodinocichla – rosy thrush-tanager

References

Further reading

External links

 Jungle-walk.com tanager pictures
 Tanager videos, photos and sounds on the Internet Bird Collection
 
 

 

Taxa named by Jean Cabanis